Ayaz is both a surname and a given name. Notable people with the name include:

Surname:
 Fareed Ayaz, Pakistani Qawwal
 Mahmood Ayaz, Pakistani surgeon
 Malik Ayaz, Turkic slave
 Shaikh Ayaz, Pakistani poet
Given name:
 Ayaz Amir, Pakistani journalist
 Ayaz Khan, Indian actor
 Ayaz Mütallibov, Soviet politician
 Ayaz Ruknuddin Khan, American financier and philanthropist 

Pakistani masculine given names
Urdu-language surnames